Yukio Ishizuka (born June 14, 1938, in Hakodate, Japan) is a psychiatrist who grew up in Japan and graduated from Keio Medical School.  He completed his internship at Jefferson Medical College Hospital in Philadelphia and his residency in psychiatry at Harvard Medical School's Massachusetts Mental Health Center in 1969.  Ishizuka was a clinical assistant Professor of Psychiatry at NYU Medical Center.  In 2007, the Japanese International Medical Student Association Ishizuka founded as a medical student received the coveted Health Culture Award at the Japanese Imperial Palace.  He is the author of the Japanese book, Self-Actualization  and has been a full-time practicing psychiatrist in New York since 1976.

In 1969, when Ishizuka completed his residency in Boston, psychoanalysis was at its zenith in American psychiatry, with many professors having undergone psychoanalytical training. Harvard Professor David Riesman encouraged Ishizuka to undergo further training in psychoanalysis under Erich Fromm.   Impressed by Fromm's initial definition of health, but questioning that psycho-analytic psychology with its emphasis on one's past was clinically effective, Ishizuka hesitated.  Not convinced that undergoing seven years of psychoanalysis could help him better understand health or happiness, he left psychiatry.  His French wife, Colette, who later inspired much of his work on intimacy and the role a spouse or comparable intimate partner plays in it, supported his decision to follow his intuition.  In 1969 he joined McKinsey and Company, an international consulting firm, as an associate in Paris. In 1972, he left consulting to become President and Co-founder of a subsidiary of Mitsubishi International Corp for mergers and acquisitions. During his fourth year in M&A, a business colleague sought his advice on how to overcome depression.  Dr. Ishizuka's rewarding experience helping his friend led him to return to the field of psychiatry in 1976.  Ishizuka returned to medicine with a desire to understand what it meant to be well.

Influences 
Ishizuka draws from the principles of both Zen Buddhism and quantum mechanics in his method of treatment.   While the latter emphasizes the interconnectedness of the entire universe, the former believes that a solution to human suffering lies in being one with the universe.  The process becoming one with the universe begins with being better related to, and experiencing a higher level of intimacy with, one's partner or wife and requires the latter's active participation.» and training in the West helped him develop a model of health across different cultures.

Ishizuka, who graduated from Keio Medical School in Tokyo, and completed his residency in psychiatry at Harvard Medical School's Massachusetts Mental Health Center in 1969, has been a full-time practicing psychiatrist in New York since 1976.  He is the author of the Japanese book, Self-Actualization.

Since 1976, Ishizuka’s main contribution has been the development of a new paradigm of health including: 
 a full personality model that withstands the demanding criteria for mental health models set forth by Marie Jahoda
 a hierarchy of defense which is mobilized when one's past experience and current capability to cope are exceeded by life challenges 
 a clinical approach that focuses on ‘closeness’ with a spouse or comparable partner for fundamental personality change 
 the use of crisis as an opportunity to  transform self, intimacy and achievement far beyond a previous best level of experience 
 a method of therapy Lifetrack, that defines, measures and enhances well-being as the central objective
 clinical insights  on self-actualization and fear, breakthrough intimacy, and stages of personality transformation under crisis

Positive mental health

In 1976, while many psychiatrists continued to be  preoccupied with the definition of psychological illnesses (Diagnostic Statistical Manuals), Ishizuka turned to a monograph by M. Jahoda published in 1958 entitled « Current Concepts of Positive Mental Health.»   Jahoda offered six conditions for developing and evaluating future models of Positive Mental Health.   In doing so, she pointed out the limits of the ‘disease’ model and set guidelines to define models of health applicable both in wellness and disease.   
Concluding that the  ‘medical’ or ‘disease model’ used in psychiatry was not fit to understand healthy human beings or to assist them in ‘normal’ or optimal functioning, Ishizuka began to build such a model.  His exposure to the East, and training in the West helped him develop a model of health across different cultures. Focusing almost entirely on the experience of his diverse patients, he challenged what he knew to define a model of health and personality applicable both in extreme distress and optimal health.

The three spheres: basic psychological needs and self-actualization

In 1975, Dr. Ishizuka hypothesized that three basic psychological needs or spheres determine psychological health and self-actualization across cultures: the search for self, the need for intimacy, and the quest for achievement.  The three spheres, also referred to as the "triad of psychological adjustment" or "tripod of happiness"  are subjective, dynamic, and broad enough to encompass all psychological events.  These three interconnected spheres characterize a person's personality.  A prolonged imbalance or a crisis in any one of these three key interconnected spheres of mental health influences the others and can trigger defensive symptoms such as anxiety, anger, physical symptoms, depression or, in some cases, psychosis.

Lifetrack Therapy: a personality model and therapy based on health

To better understand and track psychological well-being, Ishizuka broke down the self, intimacy and achievement spheres into three dimensions with nine elements each. Using simple definitions and a subjective 10 point rating scale, he encouraged patients to take five to ten minutes daily to track the three spheres, as well as positive peaks of well-being (peace, friendliness, physical-health, happiness, mastery), negative peaks (anxiety, anger, physical symptoms, depression, psychosis), physical health, and proper use of food, beverage, or other substances.  This tripod model of mental health is the basis for Lifetrack Therapy, a clinical approach drawing on the experience and insights accumulated by the daily self-rating data of more than 1,200 patients throughout their treatment on 41 parameters of mental health through periods of crisis to optimal health.  The central goal for both the ‘distressed” and the “well” in Lifetrack Therapy is the same: health and well-being in the primary three spheres of life.  Therapy sessions are focused on using crisis as an opportunity to transform the three spheres far beyond a previous best level of experience.

Personal life

Dr. Yukio Ishizuka has been happily married since 1966 to Colette Ducassé Ishizuka.  He has three children, lives in New York, and is a member of Salmagundi Club of N.Y. as a resident artist since 1974.

Publications

Ishizuka, Yukio (1981).  Self Actualization, Kodansha, Tokyo.  C0211 P600E(4)

Ishizuka, Yukio (2004). Breakthrough Intimacy – Sad to Happy through Closeness, Lifetrack, 

Ishizuka, Yukio. (2006). Breakthrough Intimacy – Conquering Depression, Lifetrack,

Further reading

Erich Fromm, The Art of Loving, Bantom Books, 1963.

Erich Fromm, D.T. Suzuki, Richard De Martino, Zen Buddhism and Psychoanalysis, Harper Collins, 1970.

Homes TH, Rahe RH. The social readjustment rating scale. J Psychosom Res 2 : 213, 1967.

Ishizuka, Yukio (1988). ‘Lifetrack Therapy,’ Psychiatric Journal University Ottawa, Vol. 13 No. 4, pp. 197–207.

Ishizuka, Y., « Divorce : Can and Should It Be Prevented ? » Family Therapy, Vol. IX, Number 1, 1982, 69-90.

Ishizuka, Y., (1981).  Self Actualization, Kodansha, Tokyo.  C0211 P600E(4)

Ishizuka, Y., « Intimacy and Stress : Effective Therapeutic Intervention, » Psychiatric Ann. 1981, 11(7), 259-265.

Ishizuka, Y., « Conjoint Therapy for Marital Problems, Psychiatric Ann. 9 : 6, June 1979.

Ishizuka, Y., « Causes of Anxiety and Depression in Marriage, » Psychiatric Ann. 9 :6, June 1979 : 302-309.

Ishizuka, N., “The Psychological Make or Buy Decision: Psychology and Transaction Cost Economics,” paper presented at the Academy of Management, Boston, August 1997.

Ishizuka, N., “Lifetrack Assumptions about Conflict Resolution and Third Party Intervention: A Case Study of Kissinger in the Middle East,” Working Paper, Harvard Law Program on Negotiation, July 1995

Jahoda, M. (1958), Current Concept of Positive Mental Health, Basic Books.

Jahoda, M. Toward a social psychology of mental health, In : Symposium on the Healthy Personality.  Senn MJE, (ed), New York : Josiah Macy Jr. Foundation, pp. 221, 219, 220, 1953.

Maslow AH. Self-Actualizing People.   A study of psychological health.  Personality Symposia 1 : 16, 1950.

Maslow AH. Motivation and Personality.  Harper and Row, 1954.

Menninger KA. What is a healthy mind ?.  In : The Healthy-Minded Child.  Crawford NA, Menninger KA (eds.), NY : Coward-McCann, pp 3–17, 1930

Menninger, W.C (1947), The Role of psychiatry in the world today, Am J Psychiatry,104: 155-163

Riesman D. Glazer N, Denny R., The Lonely Crowd, Yale Univ Press, 1950.

Shiroyama, S., The Conditions for Survival. Kodansha: Tokyo (Japan), 1991.

Presentations of Lifetrack at APA and World Congresses

Ishizuka, Y., "Breakthrough Intimacy - Treating Personality" APA (American Psychiatric Association) Annual Meeting San Diego, May 2007.

Ishizuka, Y., "Breakthrough Intimacy - Transforming Borderline Personality" Xth ISSPD (International Society for Study of Personality Disorders) Congress, Hague, September 2007

Ishizuka, Y., "Lifetrack Therapy - Treating Personality with Breakthrough Intimacy" Presentation to Private Practice Committee Meeting, American Psychiatric Association, Westchester Division, 2006

Ishizuka, Y., five 2-hour workshops presented at IV World Congress for Psychotherapy Buenos Aires, 2005 : (1) Breakthrough Intimacy – Treating Personality, (2) How to Cure Depression without Drugs, (3) Borderline Personality Disorder can be cured in 6 Months, (4) Why Couple therapy is the Gold mine of Therapeutic Productivity, (5) Psychotherapy with Single Diagnosis, Five Symptoms, and the Same Treatment.

Ishizuka, Y., and Ishizuka N. « ‘Fear of Closeness’ Underlies Interpersonal as well as International Conflicts, » Proceedings of World Congress of Psychiatry, Spain, 1996.

Ishizuka, Y., « Couple Therapy as the Standard Mode of Intervention, » Proceedings of the World Congress of Psychiatry, Spain, 1996.

Ishizuka, Y., « Patients’ Self-rating for ‘Incremental Thinking, » Proceedings of the World Congress of Psychiatry, Spain, 1996.

Ishizuka, Y., « Personality Transformation is Therapy Objective, » Proceedings of the World Congress of Psychiatry, Spain, 1996.

Ishizuka, Y., « Overcoming Defense Against Closeness, » Proceedings of the World Congress of Psychiatry, Greece, 1989.

Ishizuka, Y., « Lifetrack Therapy : A New Approach, » Proceedings of World Congress of Psychiatry, Greece, 1989.

Ishizuka, Y., « Three Dimensions of Intimacy, » Proceedings of the World Congress of Psychiatry, Vienna, 1984.

Ishizuka, Y., « Hierarchy and Matrix of Defense, » Proceedings of the 10th World Congress (1983) of Social Psychiatry, Intergroup, 1984.

Ishizuka, Y., « Daily Subjective Rating of Adjustment by Patients, » Proceedings of the 10th World Congress (1983) of Social Psychiatry, Intergroup, 1984.

Ishizuka, Y., « Psycho-Physiology and Positive Mental Health, » Proceedings of the 10th World Congress (1983) of Social Psychiatry, Intergroup, 1984.

Ishizuka, Y., « Reinventing the Wheel of Therapeutic Process, » Proceedings of the 8th World Congress of Social Psychiatry (1981), Plenum, 1984.

Ishizuka, Y., « Towards Integrative Concept of Therapeutic Objectives, » Proceedings of the 8th World Congress (1981) of Social Psychiatry, Plenum, 1984.

References

External links 
 Positive Mental Health Foundation
 Lifetrack

Japanese psychiatrists
American psychiatrists
American humanists
American psychotherapists
Keio University alumni
McKinsey & Company people
1938 births
Living people